Fatih Karagümrük Spor Kulübü, also called  Karagümrük, is a Turkish professional football club based in the Karagümrük neighbourhood of the Fatih district in Istanbul. They currently play in the Süper Lig, the top tier of Turkish football.

History

The club was founded in 1926. It joined the national tiers of the football pyramid in 1933.

The club played in the Turkish Premier League in the years 1959–1963 and 1983–84.

Karagümrük were relegated to the Turkish Regional Amateur League twice.

The side currently plays in the Süper Lig, after being promoted from the TFF First League in the 2019–20 season. The team defied the odds of many , finishing in 8th place in the Süper Lig.

League participations
 Turkish Super League: 1958–63, 1983–84, 2020–present
 TFF First League: 1963–69, 1980–83, 1984–88, 1989–92, 2004–05, 2019–20
 TFF Second League: 1969–80, 1988–89, 1992–97, 2000–01, 2002–04, 2005–08, 2014–19
 TFF Third League: 2001–02, 2008–09, 2012–14
 Turkish Regional Amateur League: 2010–12
 Amatör Futbol Ligleri: 1997–2000, 2009–10

Club staff

Players

Current squad

Out on loan

See also
Fatih Karagümrük S.K. (women's football)

References

External links

Official website
Fatih Karagümrük on TFF.org

 
Association football clubs established in 1926
Football clubs in Istanbul
Sport in Fatih
1926 establishments in Turkey
Süper Lig clubs
Sports teams in Istanbul